This is a partial list of Jupiter's  trojans (60° ahead of Jupiter) with numbers 100001–200000 .

100001–200000 

This list contains 264 objects sorted in numerical order.

top

References 
 

 Greek_1
Jupiter Trojans (Trojan Camp)
Lists of Jupiter trojans